Phlyctis is a genus of lichenized fungi in the order Gyalectales, and the type genus of the family Phlyctidaceae. Members of the genus are commonly called blemished lichens.

The genus was circumscribed by German lichenologist Julius von Flotow in 1850. The Dictionary of the Fungi (2008) estimated the widespread genus to contain 12 species, but several species have been described and added to the genus since then.

Species
Phlyctis agelaea 
Phlyctis argena 
Phlyctis boliviensis 
Phlyctis communis  – India
Phlyctis himalayensis 
Phlyctis karnatakana  – India
Phlyctis ludoviciensis 
Phlyctis lueckingii  – Sri Lanka
Phlyctis monosperma  – India
Phlyctis petraea 
Phlyctis psoromica 
Phlyctis sirindhorniae 
Phlyctis subagelaea  – India
Phlyctis subargena 
Phlyctis subhimalayensis  – India
Phlyctis subuncinata 
Phlyctis tolgensis  – Australia

References

Gyalectales
Lichen genera
Gyalectales genera
Taxa described in 1831
Taxa named by Karl Friedrich Wilhelm Wallroth